magicJack (stylized with the first letter in lower case) was an American professional soccer club based in Boca Raton, Florida. The team competed in Women's Professional Soccer (WPS) for one season until legal challenges caused the team's owner, Dan Borislow, to be banned from the WPS, which folded in 2012.

History

Freedom era

In 2001, magicJack was founded as Washington Freedom, a team of the defunct Women's United Soccer Association (WUSA). The Freedom were the only team to continue as an organization after WUSA folded, first playing exhibition games, then joining the W-League. The Freedom were a founding member of WUSA's successor, Women's Professional Soccer. In 2011, the team was purchased by Dan Borislow, the owner of the phone tech company magicJack, renamed, and relocated to Boca Raton, Florida.

First season

The team opened its 2011 season with three wins, and was the only team with a perfect record for the first month of the season. Despite this, coach Mike Lyons was then dismissed, beginning a long period of coaching controversy, while both Borislow and Christie Rampone functioned as team coach at various points.  During the 2011 FIFA Women's World Cup, magicJack lost in a WPS-record 6–0 defeat, falling to the Philadelphia Independence.

On July 22, 2011, Abby Wambach was named as magicJack's player-coach for the rest of the season. The team was the visiting side when the Western New York Flash of Rochester (Wambach's hometown) set the new WPS league record attendance of 15,404. magicJack ultimately finished third in both the regular season and the playoffs.

Battling with the league
In the waning months of the season, Borislow sent an e-mail to his players telling them that WPS was threatening to terminate the team before the season was over, and he filed a suit in Florida courts. The league denied this accusation, and agreements were made for the suit to be dropped.

On October 25, 2011, the Women's Professional League Governors voted to terminate the franchise, accusing owner Dan Borislow of violations ranging from "unprofessional and disparaging treatment of his players to failure to pay his bills." WPS also stated, "Mr. Borislow's actions have been calculated to tarnish the reputation of the league and damage the league's business relationships." All players were able to sign with new teams when free agency started on November 9, 2011.

Forward Ella Masar was the only magicJack player to publicly condemn the team owner, Dan Borislow, accusing him of mistreating players, including her.

Exhibition team
Borislow again filed suit in Florida courts; on January 10, 2012, the judge ruled that the league could not terminate the team's franchise without following its own procedures, and a hearing was set for the following week. Before adjudication resumed, WPS and Borislow reached another deal, this time allowing Borislow to keep his team as an exhibition team, guaranteeing magicJack at least seven games for each of the next two years, one at each of the WPS teams' home grounds and two in Florida. This quickly became moot as the WPS announced on January 30 that it was suspending the 2012 season; on May 18, 2012, the league ceased operations. Borislow died in 2014.

References

External links

 
Women's Professional Soccer teams
Women's soccer clubs in the United States
2011 establishments in Florida
2012 disestablishments in Florida
Association football clubs established in 2011
Association football clubs disestablished in 2012
Soccer clubs in Florida
Sports in Boca Raton, Florida